Fleenortown is an unincorporated community in Lee County, Virginia, in the United States.

History
Fleenortown was founded by Dr. Drury Fleenor, and named for him.

References

Unincorporated communities in Lee County, Virginia
Unincorporated communities in Virginia